Mexicana Universal Morelos is a pageant in Morelos, Mexico, that selects that state's representative for the national Mexicana Universal pageant.

In 2004 a State Representative was not sent. 

The State Organization has produced two Nuestra Belleza Mundo México titleholders in 1997 with Blanca Soto and 2013 with Daniela Álvarez and two designated as Nuestra Belleza Internacional México in 1999 with Graciela Soto and 2007 with Lorenza Bernot.

Nuestra Belleza Morelos is located at number 10 with four crown of Nuestra Belleza México.

Titleholders
Below are the names of the annual titleholders of Mexicana Universal Morelos, listed in ascending order, and their final placements in the Mexicana Universal after their participation, until 2017 the names was Nuestra Belleza Morelos.

<small>
1 Lorenza Bernot was a semifinalist in the Top 10, but by fulfilling the characteristics of a Queen, was designated as Nuestra Belleza Internacional México to represent the country in Miss International 2007.
2 Graciela Soto was 2nd Runner-up, but by fulfilling the characteristics of a Queen, was designated as Nuestra Belleza Internacional México to represent the country in Miss International 1999.

 Competed in Miss Universe.
 Competed in Miss World.
 Competed in Miss International.
 Competed in Miss Charm International.
 Competed in Miss Continente Americano.
 Competed in Reina Hispanoamericana.
 Competed in Miss Orb International.
 Competed in Nuestra Latinoamericana Universal.

External links
Official Website

Nuestra Belleza México